American Samoa's at-large congressional district encompasses the entire U.S. territorial region of American Samoa.  The territory does not have a voting member of Congress but does elect a delegate who can participate in debates and vote in committees of which they are a member.  Amata Coleman Radewagen is the current delegate of the islands.

From 1970 to 1978, American Samoa elected an unofficial delegate-at-large in four-year terms to lobby for formal admission to the House of Representatives; they were A. U. Fuimaono from 1971 to 1975, A. P. Lutali from 1975 to 1979 (simultaneously serving in the American Samoa Senate from 1977), and Fofō Sunia from 1979 to 1981 (when the delegate was formally recognized by Congress).

List of delegates representing the district

Recent election results

2012

2014

2016

2018

2020

References

 

At-large
At-large United States congressional districts
 
Constituencies established in 1978
1978 establishments in American Samoa